The 1841 Goshen Courthouse is located along Main Street (NY 207) in the center of Goshen, New York, the seat of Orange County, New York, United States. It was designed by popular local architect Thornton M. Niven in a Greek Revival style, meant to be a twin of the one he had already built in Newburgh, which at that time shared seat duties with the larger city. Construction of the building was approved by the county legislature in April 1841 and began shortly thereafter.

During construction of the building, the remains of American Revolutionary War Loyalist guerilla leader Claudius Smith were rumored to have been found on the site and his skull embedded in the masonry above the front door. A plaque commemorating his hanging in Goshen and the associated tradition was dedicated at the site in 2016.

It was used as a courthouse until 1970, when the recently constructed Orange County Government Center made more space available.  It was individually listed on the National Register of Historic Places in 1975.  It is also a contributing property to the Church Park Historic District.

, an annex to the courthouse houses offices of the Orange County Department of Consumer Affairs and other offices. In 2011, after the Orange County Government Center was damaged by Hurricane Irene, three Supreme Court judges relocated their cases to the courthouse. In 2015, county officials announced a $2.9 million plan to improve insulation and handicap accessibility over the course of approximately a year.

See also
National Register of Historic Places listings in Orange County, New York

References

External links

Government buildings completed in 1841
Courthouses on the National Register of Historic Places in New York (state)
Buildings and structures in Orange County, New York
National Register of Historic Places in Orange County, New York
Greek Revival architecture in New York (state)
County courthouses in New York (state)
Former courthouses in New York (state)
Goshen, New York
Individually listed contributing properties to historic districts on the National Register in New York (state)